Union Square is a shopping centre located in the centre of Aberdeen, Scotland, which opened to the public on Thursday, 29 October 2009. The centre contains a covered shopping mall and retail park. Located on Guild Street and Market Street, the development adjoins onto the side of Aberdeen railway station and a new Aberdeen bus station creating a transport hub. The mall houses more than 60 shops, over fifteen restaurants, a ten screen 2,300 seat Cineworld cinema (the largest in Aberdeen) and a 3-star Jurys Inn hotel with 203 rooms.

History
Following delays, the developer Hammerson began construction of Union Square in 2007. The hotel opened on 4 September 2009. The shopping centre itself opened on 29 October 2009. More than 40 shops were trading on opening day and this number rose to around 50 by Christmas, with many other retailers opening in 2010 and into 2011 onwards.

Transportation 

The construction of Union Square on disused railway land also saw the redevelopment of Aberdeen bus station. The shopping centre is now part of a covered interchange between the bus and railway station. Additional bus services run past the centre via Guild Street.

See also
Retail in Aberdeen
St Nicholas & Bon Accord
Trinity Shopping Centre

References

External links
Union Square official site

Shopping centres in Aberdeen
Shopping malls established in 2009
2009 establishments in Scotland